The Oklahoma Wranglers were a professional arena football team based in Oklahoma City, Oklahoma. They were members of the Central (1996–1997) and Western (1998–2001) Division of the American Conference of the Arena Football League (AFL). They previously played as the Memphis Pharaohs and Portland Forest Dragons. The team played at the Myriad, now known as the Cox Convention Center, in downtown Oklahoma City.

History

Memphis Pharaohs (1995–1996)
The Memphis Pharaohs played at the Pyramid Arena in Memphis, Tennessee in 1995 and 1996. The team was named the Pharaohs because the capital of ancient Egypt was Memphis, Egypt, and because they literally played their home games in a pyramid.  Memphis saw a return of the sport with the Memphis Xplorers of af2.

Portland Forest Dragons (1997–1999)
After a winless 1996 season, the team relocated to Portland, Oregon where they played for three seasons as the Portland Forest Dragons. In years of 1997, 1998, and 1999, the Forest Dragons compiled records of 2–12, 4–10, and 7–7, never making the playoffs while in Portland.  During the 1998 season the team featured receiver Oronde Gadsden, who won the league's Rookie of the Year award, and went on to sign with the NFL's Miami Dolphins.  Portland would see a return of the AFL in 2014 with the Portland Thunder, renamed the Portland Steel in 2016.

Oklahoma Wranglers (2000–2001)
After three seasons in Portland, the franchise relocated again, this time to Oklahoma City. The move happened after the franchise owner attempted and failed to sell the team to an owner committed to keeping the team in Portland. After relocating, the team changed their name to the Oklahoma Wranglers. The team played in Oklahoma City for two seasons before being disbanded by the league after the 2001 season.

AFL return to Oklahoma City
The AFL's developmental league af2 welcomed the Oklahoma City Yard Dawgz to play from 2004 to 2009.  In 2010, nearly a decade after the Wranglers last played, the Yard Dawgz joined the newly reorganized AFL and played only one season before folding.

Season-by-season

Notable players

Arena Football Hall of Famers

Individual awards

All-Arena players
The following Wranglers players were named to All-Arena Teams:
 WR/DB Darren Hughes (1), Brian Greene (1)
 OL/DL Tom Briggs (1)
 DS Mark Ricks (1)
 K Daron Alcorn (2)

All-Ironman players
The following Wranglers players were named to All-Ironman Teams:
 OL/DL Tom Briggs (1)

All-Rookie players
The following Wranglers players were named to All-Rookie Teams:
 WR/LB Bobby McGowens
 OS Oronde Gadsden

In popular culture
The character Colt Bennett portrayed by Ashton Kutcher in the Netflix series The Ranch says he was cut by the Portland Forest Dragons.

External links
 AFL Official website

 
2000 establishments in Oklahoma
2001 disestablishments in Oklahoma